The Second Annual Jim Crockett Sr. Memorial Cup Tag Team Tournament, also referred to as the Crocket Cup (1987), was an event held over two nights: April 10 and 11, 1987. The tournament included 24 tag teams. The tournament was won by "The Super Powers" (Dusty Rhodes and Nikita Koloff), who defeated Lex Luger and Tully Blanchard in the finals. Their victory was dedicated to Magnum T. A., who was forced to retire due to a near-fatal car accident.

Production

Background
The Jim Crockett Sr. Memorial Cup Tag Team Tournament was created by Jim Crockett Jr. of Jim Crockett Promotions (JCP) in honor of Crockett's father, JCP founder Jim Crockett Sr. The tournament format was single-elimination with a promoted prize of $1 million (U.S.) awarded to the winning team.

Storylines
The 1987 Crockett Cup shows featured a total of 25 professional wrestling matches with different wrestlers involved in pre-existing scripted feuds, plots and storylines. Wrestlers are portrayed as either heels (those that portray the "bad guys"), faces (the "good guy" characters) or tweeners (characters that is neither clearly a heel or a face) as they follow a series of tension-building events, which culminated in a wrestling match or series of matches as determined by the promotion.

Aftermath
Stan Lane was announced as the replacement for Dennis Condrey (who suddenly left JCP) in the Midnight Express on April 4, 1987 on an episode of World Championship Wrestling, and would win the vacant NWA United States Tag Team Championship in May of 1987.  After the tournament ended, Rick Rude would leave JCP for the WWF and the NWA World Tag Team Championship would be won by the Rock & Roll Express in a phantom match in Spokane, Washington when Ivan Koloff "substituted" for Rude.  Manny Fernandez would also leave JCP for the AWA.  

Jim Crockett completed his purchase of Bill Watts' UWF in April, 1987, but it would take a few months for the UWF wrestlers to make their way to JCP television, though some of them went to WWF, including Ted DiBiase and (earlier) Hacksaw Jim Duggan.  Crockett also took over operations of Championship Wrestling from Florida and some of their wrestlers would begin to be on JCP's TV programs, including Mike Rotunda and Kevin Sullivan.

Event

Tournament participants

Results

Non-tournament matches
Ole Anderson defeated Big Bubba Rogers in a Last Man Standing Steel Cage match 
Ric Flair defeated Barry Windham to retain the NWA World Heavyweight Championship

Tournament brackets

† The Rock 'n' Roll Express were unable to compete due to an eye injury to Ricky Morton. Baba and Takagi won the match by forfeit.

References

1987 in Maryland
1987 in professional wrestling
Jim Crockett Promotions shows
National Wrestling Alliance shows
Professional wrestling in Baltimore
1987